Shoot the Messenger can refer to:

 Shoot the Messenger (film)
 Shoot the Messenger (TV series)